Euderopus is a genus of beetles in the family Biphyllidae, containing the following species:

 Euderopus brevipes Sharp, 1900
 Euderopus iteratus Sharp, 1900
 Euderopus meridionalis Grouvelle
 Euderopus microps Sharp, 1900
 Euderopus perbrevis Sharp, 1900
 Euderopus regularis Sharp, 1900
 Euderopus setosus Sharp, 1900
 Euderopus unicolor Sharp, 1900

References

Biphyllidae
Cleroidea genera